The Shamss Ensemble is a musical group that performs traditional Sufi and classical Iranian music with the Tanbour, Daf (frame drum), Ney and various other percussion instruments. The group was founded by composer Kaykhosro Pournazeri. His sons Tahmoures and Sohrab are also members of the group.

History
Pournazeri formed the Shamss Ensemble with a vision of bringing back the lost art of Tanbour through compositions that fused the Tanbour with other traditional classical mode instruments.

He invited fellow musicians who were familiar playing such classical pieces, they eventually became a popular musical ensemble in Iran. Initially, the group performed under the name of Tanbour-e-Shams, but adding traditional and Kurdish music to their performances, they took the name of the Shamss Ensemble.

The Shamss Ensemble has performed at over 300 international venues and was on tour in the United States in 2008 during the month of October.

Members 

Over the years, there have been more than fifty players and singers, the majority of whom were Pournazeri's students. After the 1979 Islamic Revolution in Iran, women were banned from performing solo in front of men—that includes singing or playing any instruments. Only recently, women have been included as vocalists and players of the Tanbour.

Albums

Live Performances 

 2020: Shamss Ensemble and Homayoun Shajarian at Theatre de la Ville, Paris, France
 2020: Bozar Music Festival, Shamss Ensemble and Homayoun Shajarian at Palais des Beaux-Arts, Brussels, Belgium
 2018: Shamss Ensemble at FEZ Music Festival, Jnan sbil, Fes, Morocco
 2018: Shamss Ensemble at Konya Mystic Music Festival, Konya, Turkey

See also
Music of Iran

References

External links 
Official Website 
Shams Ensemble Touring U.S. This Month 
The World

Persian classical music groups
Kurdish musical groups